Gary Steven Krist (born April 29, 1945) is an American convicted of kidnapping and the trafficking of undocumented immigrants.

Early life
He was born in Aberdeen, Washington, on April 29, 1945, and grew up in Pelican, Alaska. He lived part of his childhood in Utah. His first recorded crime was a string of robberies at the age of 14, in 1959. He escaped with another prisoner from Deuel Vocational Institution, a California state prison, in November 1966, while serving a sentence for automobile theft; the other prisoner was killed during the attempt.

Mackle kidnapping

He is best known for kidnapping and burying heiress Barbara Jane Mackle alive in a ventilated box in 1968. After receiving $500,000 in ransom money, he was captured and sentenced to life in prison.

While imprisoned, Krist wrote a book, Life: The Man Who Kidnapped Barbara Jane Mackle, published in 1972.

Parole and medical practice
Krist was paroled after serving 10 years and granted a pardon after he was accepted to medical school the Autonomous University of Guadalajara in Mexico so that he could become a physician. In December 2001, after his application to practice medicine in Alabama was rejected, the Medical Licensing Board of Indiana granted him a probationary license, under which he was required to report to the board every six months and submit to psychiatric evaluation, and was prohibited from prescribing certain drugs. He practiced medicine in Chrisney, Indiana, until  his medical license was revoked in 2003, as a result of not disclosing a disciplinary action he had received during his medical residency.

Later crimes
Krist chartered a boat to South America in January 2006. When he returned on March 6, 2006, authorities were waiting for him and discovered four undocumented immigrants, who paid $6,000 each to come to the United States, and 14 kilograms of cocaine in paste form valued at around US$1 million. He was arrested in Point Clear, Alabama, for conspiracy to bring cocaine and illegal immigrants into the United States. It was also discovered that he was running a cocaine operation in Barrow County, Georgia. On May 16, 2006, Krist pleaded guilty to drug smuggling; and, on January 19, 2007, he was sentenced to five years and five months in prison at the Federal Correctional Institution in Marianna, Florida. He was released from prison in November 2010.

On August 27, 2012, in Mobile, Alabama, U.S. District Judge Callie V. Granade revoked Krist's supervised release for violating his probation. He had left the country without permission, sailing to Cuba and South America on his sailboat. Judge Granade sentenced Krist to 40 months imprisonment.

See also
List of fugitives from justice who disappeared
Ruth Eisemann-Schier

References

External links
 
 

1945 births
20th-century American criminals
American memoirists
Living people
Physicians from Indiana
American people convicted of kidnapping
People from Aberdeen, Washington
Criminals from Alaska